Trancoso Municipality may refer to

Places

Mexico
 Trancoso Municipality, Zacatecas, a municipality in the State of Zacatecas

Portugal
 Trancoso Municipality, Portugal, a municipality in the district of Guarda

Municipality name disambiguation pages